Coxford is a hamlet in the parish of St Gennys (where the 2011 census population was included ) in north  Cornwall, England.

References

Hamlets in Cornwall